The Intercontinental Derby is any football match between rivals Fenerbahçe SK and Galatasaray SK. The fixture is widely regarded as the biggest football match in Turkey, and one of the biggest matches in international football because of the success both clubs have had in Turkish football, the intensity of the matches, and the immense hate between the two teams. The fixture has been in existence for more than a century and has developed into one of the greatest, most intense and often bitter derbies in the world, traditionally attracting very large attendances and nearly equal support for both teams throughout the country. The derby is known as "intercontinental" because Fenerbahçe and Galatasaray are two of the major Turkish teams from the Asian and the European parts of Istanbul respectively.

History

The first game played between the two sides was a friendly game on Sunday, 17 January 1909. The game, staged at Papazın Çayırı where Şükrü Saracoğlu Stadium is located today, finished 2–0 in favour of Galatasaray. Fenerbahçe achieved their first victory over Galatasaray when they defeated them 4–2 in the 4th gameweek of the Istanbul Football League on Sunday, 4 January 1914.

On 21 September 2003, the two clubs played the Süper Lig game in front of a record attendance of 71,334 people, with drawing the game 2–2. The biggest win is achieved by Galatasaray with winning 7–0 on 12 February 1911. This match, however, was only mentioned by Galatasaray and due to the absence of neutral third-party sources, the line-ups and details of the match are disputed and not completely verifiable, because there were close to no witnesses of this event. The biggest modern-day victory is when Fenerbahçe achieved their biggest win against Galatasaray on 6 November 2002 with 6–0, where four goals were scored when Fenerbahçe was one man down. Fenerbahçe are known for rarely losing at home in derbies, in the Şükrü Saracoğlu Stadium, Galatasaray could not defeat Fenerbahçe for 20 years (in 23 consecutive matches) until 23 February 2020, when Galatasaray finally defeated Fenerbahçe, marking the first time Galatasaray won a game at Şükrü Saraçoğlu (away) after 20 years, since 22 December 1999.

Idea to merge Fenerbahçe and Galatasaray

The first league games in Turkey were held in Istanbul in 1904. This league was called Istanbul Football League originally. The teams participating were called Cadi-Keuy FC, Moda FC, Elpis FC and HMS Imogene. 
These teams were made up of the English, Greek, and Armenian minorities living in Turkey. Galatasaray SK joined the league in 1906–07 and Fenerbahçe SK in 1909–10. Galatasaray SK did not participate in the 1911–12 season and the club suggested to loan Emin Bülent Serdaroğlu, Celal Ibrahim and two other Galatasaray SK players to Fenerbahçe SK for the match against Strugglers FC. But Fenerbahçe SK did not accept this offer. In 1912 Galatasaray SK president Ali Sami Yen and Fenerbahçe SK president Galip Kulaksızoğlu made a meeting.
They arranged a protocol and agreed to form a strong Turkish team against the non-Turkish teams in the league.
According to this agreement the new club would have been called Türkkulübü (The Turkish Club), full white kit with a red star. Additionally they also agreed to set up a museum. On 23 August 1912 they presented the petition to the International Olympic Committee – Ottoman section. Due to the Balkan Wars in 1913, this agreement could not be enforced.

Beginning of the rivalry

1934 Riots 
Friday 23 February 1934 was the day when unexpected riots happened at a supposed to be friendly match between Fenerbahçe and Galatasaray played at Taksim Stadium. Milliyet reported the match by saying "those who went to watch the match yesterday watched the police case, not football." Both teams wanted to win badly and therefore the match had to be stopped many times because of hard fouls. The high tension on the pitch caused high tension on the stands as well. The game ended with players fighting. The referee had no choice except to abandon the match. It was the end of friendly displays between both clubs.

Professionalisation of Turkish football
The professional nationwide league (known as Süper Lig today) was formed in 1959, a few years after the foundation of UEFA in 1954. It is the top-flight professional league in Turkish nationwide football, and the most popular sporting competition in the country. The 1959 Millî Lig (National League) was the first season of the professional league in Turkey. The league was made up of sixteen clubs split into two groups: the Kırmızı Grup (Red Group) and Beyaz Grup (White Group), the colours of the Turkish flag. The first season took place in the calendar year of 1959, instead of 1958–59, because the qualifying stages took place in 1958. The final consisted of two legs took place between the winners of each group. Galatasaray won the Red Group and Fenerbahçe won the White Group, so both teams played each other to determine the champion. Galatasaray won the first match 1–0. Metin Oktay scored the goal and the ball ripped the net, but Fenerbahçe won the second leg 4–0, winning 4–1 on aggregate.

Graeme Souness flag incident
In the 1995–96 season, when Galatasaray reached the cup final against Fenerbahçe, Fenerbahçe were expected to win easily. However, Galatasaray beat Fenerbahçe in the first leg by a Dean Saunders penalty. Galatasaray manager Graeme Souness took a large Galatasaray flag after the match and planted it in the center of the pitch. According to Souness, he did it as a result of an insult from a Fenerbahce manager.

"The water derby" incident 
During the 2006-07 Süper Lig season, Fenerbahçe guarenteed to be the champions before the derby on May 19, 2007. Because of thousands of plastic water bottles, stadium seats and other materials thrown by Galatasaray fans in Ali Sami Yen Stadium, the match earned the nickname "water derby" (Turkish: sulu derbi). The match ended with a Fenerbahçe victory.

Fan rivalry

Fenerbahçe SK and Galatasaray SK are the most popular Turkish clubs; both sides have large fanbases that follow them in domestic and international matches. Football hooliganism is a common phenomenon between their fans in recent years, featuring anything from breaking seats, cursing, fighting, fireworks and street rioting. The hatred is so intense that many violent incidents have taken place in several regions of Istanbul as well as in rest of Turkey, especially before or after a derby.

Incidents
In 2006, Galatasaray supporters opened a racist banner which targeted Mehmet Aurélio, a Fenerbahçe and Turkish national team player with Brazilian roots. The Fenerbahçe supporters protested which resulted in them getting attacked by Galatasaray fans.

On 13 May 2013, a Fenerbahçe fan was stabbed multiple times to death after the Intercontinental Derby. After the match, which resulted in a 2–1 victory for Fenerbahçe, the 19 year old Fenerbahçe fan was on his way home after the match when he and his companions were attacked by Galatasaray fans.

Rivalry
Both clubs compete with each other for the title of the most successful football club in Turkey, as well as the greatest Turkish sports club overall.

In football, Fenerbahçe SK is more successful in the Intercontinental Derby games but Galatasaray won the Turkish Super League championship 22 times and Fenerbahçe 19 times. Fenerbahçe's request for 9 championships before the Turkish Super League has not yet received a positive response from the Turkish Football Federation. Apart from this, Galatasaray won the Turkish Cup 18 times, while Fenerbahçe won it 6 times to date. Galatasaray has been a more successful club than Fenerbahçe in almost every period of European cups. Apart from the 2000 UEFA Cup champion and 2000 UEFA Super Cup champion titles, it has played quarter-finals many times in the European Cup and the Champions League and has the title of the Turkish club that has collected the most points in the Champions League until today. Fenerbahçe's greatest achievements in European cups are the Champions League quarter-finals in the 2007–2008 season and the Europa League semi-finals in the 2012–2013 season.

Culture
The rivalry between the two top Turkish clubs can be traced back to some social, cultural, and regional differences. Galatasaray were founded in 1905 by Galatasaray High School students in the district of Beyoğlu. In the early decades of Turkish football Galatasaray were considered the classic representative of the high class French influenced society of Istanbul. On the other hand, Fenerbahçe were founded by middle class Muslim & Greek men in the district of Kadıköy in 1907. Fenerbahçe were known as the people's club and were considered the representative of the blue-collar workers. In the 70s, Fenerbahçe were supported by 60% of the country while Galatasaray were still heavily supported by the high class society of Istanbul, however Galatasaray managed to close the gap between the two clubs after the club started to rise and match Fenerbahçe's strength from 1987 onward especially in the 1990s eventually winning the UEFA Cup and UEFA Super Cup in 2000. The class differences between the fanbases have slowly faded out and the social gap that once separated the two sides has closed over the years. Nowadays, both clubs boast fanbases that represent all the social classes.

Fenerbahçe's 21-year long home undefeated streak 1999–2020: Kadıköy curse 
On 22 December 1999, Galatasaray won against Fenerbahçe at Kadıköy 2–1. Galatasaray completed the season with a treble, winning the national league, national cup and the second level European competition, UEFA Cup. Since then, Galatasaray were winless at away territory for 20 years which added another dimension to the history of these derby matches, which became one of the most famous streaks and curses in Turkish sports history. Fenerbahçe, being a strong team at home turf also managed to create undefeated streaks against other rivals such as Beşiktaş and Trabzonspor. These 20 years included Yellow Canaries' thrashings such as 6–0 in 2002, 4–0 in 2006 and 4–1 in 2008. Galatasaray also had unlucky misses ending in draws, including 2–2 in 2012. While Galatasaray did not develop a similarly invincible form against Fenerbahçe at their home stadia, Ali Sami Yen and Nef Stadium, Galatasaray still had the upper hand at home. Instead, Galatasaray were dominant at neutral grounds, including a 5-1 win at Ataturk Olympic Stadium at 2005 Turkish Cup Final and 2012 and 2013 Turkish Super Cup matches played at Erzurum and Kayseri respectively.

During the life of the streak, Fenerbahçe won six league titles, while Galatasaray won eight. The streak highly contributed to the "derby psychology" in favor of Fenerbahçe. Fenerbahçe fans gleefully celebrated the streak with İşte böyle, her sene böyle chants (This is how it is, it's the same every year). Instead, Galatasaray fans argued that matches at continental scene and national championships are more important than winning against Fenerbahçe.

The streak was attributed to Yusuf Fahir Ataer, also known as Yusuf Fahir Baba, who was a Bektashi sheikh and a player for the precursor of Fenerbahçe, Black Stockings and then Fenerbahçe itself. His home, where was also a tekke, was next to Papazın Çayırı, where now Şükrü Saraçoğlu Stadium stands. When the stadium was expanded, the stadium grounds included his former home. It was told that his spirit and magic protected Fenerbahçe no matter what.

In 2012, two matches were played at Kadıköy due to the Süper Final format. At the regular season match on 17 March 2012, Galatasaray came back and equalized the score, 2–2, and striker Milan Baroš' shot hit the goalpost at stoppage time, denying The Lions a win. On 12 May 2012, at the latest matchday of Süper Final group which determined the champion, the third derby and the second derby at Kadıköy in two months ended goalless. While the streak was extended, the draw was enough for Galatasaray to claim the championship at away territory. After the match, riot police were deployed in and outside the stadium. Galatasaray executives insisted to lift the trophy and celebrate at their rivals' pitch, much to the chagrin of Fenerbahçe executives and supporters. Stadium officials turned the stadium lights off and unwelcome Galatasaray celebrated their championship at Kadıköy under camera lights. Then Fenerbahçe executive Nihat Özdemir told "I will never forgive them for what they have done."

In 2016, Fenerbahçe won their last match in the streak, winning 2–0. Then, for three years, derbies at Kadıköy ended in a draw as both teams played cautious and defensive.

On 23 February 2020, the streak ended as Galatasaray won 3–1 at Kadıköy. The stoppage time for second half of the game was 10 minutes and Henry Onyekuru scored the third goal of The Lions at minute 90+7. Fenerbahçe president Ali Koç argued with Fenerbahçe fans and even jumped to the below deck from his seat, finding himself in an altercation with the fans. Fatih Terim, who is the manager of Galatasaray, saw both matches starting and ending the streak as the manager, on 1999 and 2020.

The next season, Fenerbahçe had their worst home record in decades, losing seven matches out of twenty. Another rival Fenerbahçe managed to develop a home undefeated streak, Beşiktaş, won against Fenerbahçe 4–3 at Kadıköy and broke their fateful streak as well. On 6 February 2021, Galatasaray denied Fenerbahçe the chance to rebound as mid-season transfer Mostafa Mohamed scored the only goal of the match for The Lions. After the match, a Fenerbahçe fan tried to assault Galatasaray executive Abdurrahim Albayrak while Albayrak was giving an interview, only to find himself beaten by Albayrak's bodyguards. Though Galatasaray had now developed their own streak of invincibility at the away ground, it would not last for long, as they would go on to lose 2-0 to Fenerbahçe the following year.

Honours 

Note= Calculated based on official tournaments.Turkish Football Federation Website

Supporters

 In a 2011 poll, 1.4 million Turkish citizens were asked for the team that they support in Turkey by bilyoner.com, the results ended with Galatasaray scoring 35% of the votes while Fenerbahçe scored 34% making up almost seven tenths of the fans. Fenerbahçe claimed the poll was inaccurate for many reasons such as the number of people asked compared to whole population and regions the poll was conducted in. Club officials stated Fenerbahçe is "always indisputably the most popular club in Turkey", with many football commentators and world class players supporting this claim.
 In the research conducted by Socios company in July 2022 and with the participation of 45,774 people in Turkey, Galatasaray has 37.6% and Fenerbahçe 32.3%.

Highest attendance

List of all matches

Head-to-head ranking in Süper Lig

• Total: Fenerbahçe with 33 higher finishes, Galatasaray with 31 higher finishes (as of the end of the 2021–22 season).

Biggest difference wins

Fenerbahçe 6–0 Galatasaray (2002) 
Fenerbahçe 6–0 Galatasaray was the league match between Fenerbahçe and Galatasaray in the sixth week of the 2002–03 Süper Lig season. Fenerbahçe received two red cards while Galatasaray received one, and the match ended with Fenerbahçe with 9 players left winning 6–0 against Galatasaray with 10 players left. The match was played on 6 November 2002 at Fenerbahçe Şükrü Saracoğlu Stadium. The match went down in history as the most different victory in the Fenerbahçe-Galatasaray derby in the Süper Lig, the highest league of the country since 1959. In the derby, also known as the Intercontinental Derby, Fenerbahçe's goals were scored by Tuncay Şanlı, Ariel Ortega, Serhat Akın (2), Ceyhun Eriş and Ümit Özat.

Match details

Fenerbahçe 0–7 Galatasaray (1911) 
According to Galatasaray, the 1910–11 Istanbul Football League match between Galatasaray and Fenerbahçe at Union Club Field took place on Sunday 12 February 1911. While some sources state that such a match was possibly played in 1911; due to the absence of neutral third-party sources the line-ups, details and even the outcome of the match are disputed and not completely verifiable and all information comes from Galatasaray. Large score differences were common and considered normal in early days of Turkish football, but still since there is no coverage by neutral third-party sources about this match at all, any and all information about this game comes from the club of Galatasaray.

On 12 February 1911, Galatasaray allegedly achieved the club's highest Intercontinental Derby win by beating Fenerbahçe 7–0. According to the club of Galatasaray, they started the match with only six players since they could not cross the Bosphorus by ferry due to a heavy storm. Emin Bülent Serdaroğlu could join the team after the match started. Galatasaray played with seven players ten minutes into the game. Fenerbahçe started the match with 10 players but finished the game with only 9 due to injuries. After the injury of Fenerbahçe's goalkeeper, the remaining players replaced each other to keep the goal post.

Statistics

Head to head
As of 08 January 2023

Biggest wins (5+ goals)

Most consecutive wins

Most consecutive draws

Most consecutive matches without a draw

Longest undefeated runs

Highest scoring matches

Most consecutive matches without conceding a goal

Most consecutive games scoring

Player

Most appearances

Top scorers

Most goals by a player in a match

Crossing the Bosphorus
(In bold: Transfer between both clubs)

Players

Galatasaray to Fenerbahçe
 Hamit Hüsnü Kayacan (Gala 1905–1912, Fener 1912–1913)
 Galip Kulaksızoğlu (Gala 1906–1907, Fener 1907–1922)
 Hasan Kâmil Sporel (Gala 1910–1911, Fener 1918–1923)
 Hikmet Topuzer (Gala 1909, Fener 1909–1915)
 Ismail Kurt (Gala 1956–1960, Fener 1960–1966)
 Mehmet Oğuz (Gala 1967–1979, Fener 1979–1980)
 Engin Verel (Gala 1973–1975, Fener 1975–1979/1983–1986)
 Güngör Tekin (Gala 1975–1980, Fener 1981–1983)
 Erdoğan Arıca (Gala 1977–1981, Fener 1981–1986)
 Semih Yuvakuran (Gala 1983–1990, Fener 1990–1995)
 Tanju Çolak (Gala 1987–1991, Fener 1991–1993)
 Mustafa Yücedağ (Gala 1990–1992, Fener 1992–1993)
 Benhur Babaoğlu (Gala 1993–1994, Fener 1996–1997)
 Elvir Bolić (Gala 1992–1993, Fener 1995–2000)
 Emre Belözoğlu (Gala 1994–2001, Fener 2008–2012/2013–2015/2019–2020)
 Sedat Balkanlı (Gala 1994–1995, Fener 1996)
 Saffet Sancaklı (Gala 1994–1995, Fener 1996–1998)
 Fatih Akyel (Gala 1997–2001, Fener 2002–2004)
 Mehmet Yozgatlı (Gala 1999–2001, Fener 2004–2007)
 Caner Erkin (Gala 2009–2010, Fener 2010–2016/2020–)
 Mehmet Topal (Gala 2006–2010, Fener 2012–2019)
 Tolga Ciğerci (Gala 2016–2018, Fener 2018–2021)
 Serdar Aziz (Gala 2016–2019, Fener 2019–)
 Garry Rodrigues (Gala 2017–2019, Fener 2019–2020)
 Sinan Gümüş (Gala 2014–2019, Fener 2020–2022)
 Emre Mor (Gala 2019–2020, Fener 2022–)
 Bruma (Gala 2013–2017, Fener 2022–)

Fenerbahçe to Galatasaray
 Dalaklı Hüseyin (Fenerbahçe 1907–1911, Galatasaray 1911–1913)
 Horace Armitage (Fener 1908, Gala 1908–1911)
 Bekir Refet (Fener 1912–1914, Gala 1921)
 Niyazi Tamakan (Fener 1952–1960, Gala 1960–1962)
 Naci Erdem (Fener 1953–1964, Gala 1964–1966)
 Raşit Çetiner (Fener 1978–1981, Gala 1981–1986)
 Hasan Vezir (Fener 1988–1989, Gala 1989–1991)
 Selçuk Yula (Fener 1979–1986, Gala 1991–1993)
 Erhan Önal (Fener 1981–1982, Gala 1985–1992)
 İlyas Tüfekçi (Fener 1983–1986, Gala 1986–1990)
 Emre Aşık (Fener 1993–1996, Gala 2000–2003/2006–2007/2008–2010)
 Ahmet Yıldırım (Fener 1993–1994, Gala 1999–2001)
 Elvir Baljić (Fener 1998–1999, Gala 2002–2004)
 Abdullah Ercan (Fener 1999–2003, Gala 2003–2004)
 Sergen Yalçın (Fener 1999–2000, Gala 2000/2001–2002)
 Haim Revivo (Fener 2000–2002, Gala 2002–2003)
 Servet Çetin (Fener 2003–2006, Gala 2007–2012)
 Stjepan Tomas (Fener 2003–2004, Gala 2004–2007)
 Colin Kazim-Richards (Fener 2007–2011, Gala 2011–2012)
 Burak Yılmaz (Fener 2008–2010, Gala 2012–2016)
 Olcan Adın (Fener 2003–2008, Gala 2014–2016)
 Bilal Kısa (Fener 2000–2003, Gala 2015–2016)
 Şener Özbayraklı (Fener 2015–2019, Gala 2019–2021)

Manager

Galatasaray to Fenerbahçe
 Peter Molloy (Gala 1947–1949, Fener 1949–1951)
 Tomislav Kaloperović (Gala 1968–1970, Fener 1976–1978)
 Tomislav Ivić (Gala 1983–1984, Fener 1995)
 Mustafa Denizli (Gala 1987–1989/1990–1992, 2015–2016 Fener 2000–2002)

Fenerbahçe to Galatasaray
 Jozsef Svensk (Fener 1932–1935/1938–1939, Gala 1947)
 László Székely (Fener 1951–1953, Gala 1953–1954)

See also
Beşiktaş–Fenerbahçe rivalry
Beşiktaş–Galatasaray rivalry
The Intercontinental Derby (basketball)
Major football rivalries
Sports rivalry
Big Three (Turkey)

Notes

External links
Fenerbahçe SK official website
Galatasaray SK official website

References

Turkey football rivalries
Fenerbahçe S.K. (football)
Galatasaray S.K. (football)